In mathematics, specifically measure theory, a complex measure generalizes the concept of measure by letting it have complex values. In other words, one allows for sets whose size (length, area, volume) is a complex number.

Definition 

Formally, a complex measure  on a measurable space  is a complex-valued function

that is sigma-additive.

As  for any permutation (bijection) , it follows that  converges unconditionally (hence absolutely).

Integration with respect to a complex measure 

One can define the integral of a complex-valued measurable function with respect to a complex measure in the same way as the Lebesgue integral of a real-valued measurable function with respect to a non-negative measure, by approximating a measurable function with simple functions. Just as in the case of ordinary integration, this more general integral might fail to exist, or its value might be infinite (the complex infinity).

Another approach is to not develop a theory of integration from scratch, but rather use the already available concept of integral of a real-valued function with respect to a non-negative measure. To that end, it is a quick check that the real and imaginary parts μ1 and μ2 of a complex measure μ are finite-valued signed measures. One can apply the Hahn-Jordan decomposition to these measures to split them as

and

where μ1+, μ1−, μ2+, μ2− are finite-valued non-negative measures (which are unique in some sense). Then, for a measurable function f which is real-valued for the moment, one can define

as long as the expression on the right-hand side is defined, that is, all four integrals exist and when adding them up one does not encounter the indeterminate ∞−∞.

Given now a complex-valued measurable function, one can integrate its real and imaginary components separately as illustrated above and define, as expected,

Variation of a complex measure and polar decomposition 

For a complex measure μ, one defines its variation, or absolute value, |μ| by the formula

where A is in Σ and the supremum runs over all sequences of disjoint sets (An)n whose union is A. Taking only finite partitions of the set A into measurable subsets, one obtains an equivalent definition.

It turns out that |μ| is a non-negative finite measure. In the same way as a complex number can be represented in  a polar form, one has a polar decomposition for a complex measure: There exists a measurable function θ with real values such that

meaning

for any absolutely integrable measurable function f, i.e., f satisfying

One can use the Radon–Nikodym theorem to prove that the variation is a measure and the existence of the polar decomposition.

The space of complex measures

The sum of two complex measures is a complex measure, as is the product of a complex measure by a complex number. That is to say, the set of all complex measures on a measure space (X, Σ) forms a vector space over the complex numbers. Moreover, the total variation  defined as

is a norm, with respect to which the space of complex measures is a Banach space.

See also
 Riesz representation theorem
 Signed measure
 Vector measure

External links
 Complex measure on MathWorld

Measures (measure theory)